Orchard Heights is an unincorporated community located within East Brunswick Township in Middlesex County, New Jersey, United States. The area is part of a suburban residential neighborhood between Milltown and Dunhams Corner Roads (County Route 535) interchange with New Jersey Route 18. Near the area includes two schools (one elementary school and East Brunswick High School), churches, and St. Mary's Cemetery. The subdivision was planned and built in about 1954.

References

East Brunswick, New Jersey
Unincorporated communities in Middlesex County, New Jersey
Unincorporated communities in New Jersey